Three ships of the United States Navy have been named Badger:

, an auxiliary cruiser purchased in 1898 and used in the Spanish–American War
, a Wickes-class destroyer commissioned in 1919 and active during World War II
, a Knox-class destroyer escort commissioned in 1970, reclassified as a frigate in 1975 and decommissioned in 1991

See also

, a ferry

Sources

United States Navy ship names